İstinye Park is a shopping center in the İstinye quarter of Istanbul, Turkey with 291 stores,  of retail area, and four levels of underground parking. The center features both enclosed and open-air sections. The open-air section has a green central park and offers street-side shopping.

The center includes an authentic Turkish food bazaar- a traditional market place, inspired by Turkish architecture and history.

Design and layout 

There are three distinct sections present in the building:

The Grand Rotunda is a central entertainment space, consisting of a four level arena-like space beneath a scalloped/segmented shell. It is supported by a central exterior mast over 3 panoramic elevators. The 75-meter-diameter hard-shell canopy encloses a 9 m diameter vertically moving stage. The Rotunda also features kinetic water sculptures animated with lights and music.
The Lifestyle Center is an open-air town square incorporating a green central park and Fashion District – the glass-roofed indoor retail area.
 The Bazaar area is distinguished from the rest of the center with its historical Turkish styling- each facade has been inspired by Turkish architecture and history.

The project design was led by US architect, BCT Design Group Inc., based in Baltimore. The design period -from conceptual, schematic, to development- lasted for about a year. Ömerler Mimarlik, based in Istanbul, drafted construction drawings and handled implementation. The construction period went on for 26 months- from the first lay of foundation until the grand opening. From the first sketch to the completion of the project, it took (2004–2007) 3 years in total.

Transportation 
City buses number 29, 29B, 29P, 29S, 40B, 42, EL1, EL2 provides access to the center, and the center is a short walk east of İ.T.Ü.—Ayazağa metro station.

See also
 List of shopping malls in Istanbul

References

 IstinyePark Official Website

External links

Shopping malls in Istanbul
Sarıyer
Istanbul Central Business District